Lauren Layfield (born on 1 December 1987) is an English television and radio presenter and journalist who works mainly for CBBC and Capital FM.

Career 
Layfield joined CBBC continuity in September 2015, at the end of the one-off TV special Hacker's Birthday Bash: 30 Years of Children's BBC, going on to co-host design series, The Dengineers with Mark Wright. In April 2017, Wright left and was replaced with Joe Tracini.

In January 2016, Layfield joined All Over the Place and became a co-host with Ed Petrie. Layfield has made one-off appearances in game shows Ultimate Brain and Celebrity Mastermind and four appearances in the panel show The Dog Ate My Homework.

A 2016 clip in which Layfield appeared on a CBBC children's show with Hacker T. Dog, during which Hacker deadpanned to Layfield "We're just normal men... We're just innocent men.", prompting Layfield to break character and laugh has resurfaced in 2022 and went viral. While some assumed the clip had context before the exchange, puppeteer Phil Fletcher later explained that there was none, and he just ad-libbed the line to make Layfield laugh.

In 2017 Layfield become the new host of music show The Playlist.

She presented for Match of the Day spin-off show, Match of the Day Kickabout.

In July 2018, she began covering weekend shows on Capital FM and started presenting Capital FM's Capital Early Breakfast show from 7 January 2019. She and Rob Howard are the main relief presenters for Capital Breakfast with Roman Kemp.

Layfield has also written for the Top of the Pops magazine.

Filmography

References

External links 

Lauren Layfield (Capital FM)

Living people
1987 births
Capital (radio network)
English journalists
English people of Indo-Guyanese descent
English television presenters
People from Sale, Greater Manchester